Telestes turskyi is a species of cyprinid restricted to lake Buško Blato in Bosnia and Herzegovina and Čikola River, a tributary of the Krka in Croatia. This species was thought to be extinct, but was found in May 2002 by J. Freyhof and N. Bogutskaya. Its habitat continues to decline due to water extraction and drought.

See also
 Lazarus taxon

References

  Database entry includes a range map and justification for why this species is critically endangered
 Crivelli, A.J. 2005. Telestes turskyi. In: IUCN 2006. 2006 IUCN Red List of Threatened Species. <www.iucnredlist.org>. Downloaded on 14 May 2006 .
 

Telestes
Fish described in 1843
Endemic fauna of the Balkans
Freshwater fish of Europe
Endemic fish of the Neretva basin
Fish of Bosnia and Herzegovina